Li Gu may refer to:

 Li Gu (Han dynasty) (李固; 93–147), style name Zijian (子堅), Eastern Han Dynasty scholar and official
 Li Gu (Later Zhou) (李穀; 903–960), Later Zhou Dynasty chancellor
 Li Gu (李固), fictional character in the novel Water Margin, Lu Junyi's housekeeper who betrayed his master

See also
 Gu Li (disambiguation) for people surnamed Gu